Sultanah Nur Diana Petra Abdullah (née Yana Yakoubka; born 25 February 1988) is the Sultanah of Kelantan and the wife of Sultan Muhammad V, the current Sultan of Kelantan.

Marriage 
Sultanah Nur Diana Petra Abdullah married Sultan Muhammad V of Kelantan on 30 October 2010.

Public role and appearances
Her first public appearance as Sultanah of Kelantan is in September 2022 where she received a visit by a group from the Pertubuhan Kerabat D’Raja Kelantan (PKDK) at the Kubang Kerian State Palace.

As queen consort to the Sultan of Kelantan, she accompanied her husband in official events. She attended the investiture ceremony in conjunction with Sultan Muhammad V's 53rd birthday celebration on 12 November 2022.

Royal title
As a commoner who became queen consort to a reigning Sultan of Kelantan, she was conferred the title of Sultanah of Kelantan by her husband Sultan Muhammad V on 2 August 2022.

Honours 
She was awarded:

Honours of Kelantan 
  Recipient (DK) of the Royal Family Order (Al-Yunusi Star)
  Knight Grand Commander (SPMK) of the Order of the Crown of Kelantan (Al-Muhammadi Star) - Dato'

References 

Living people
Royal House of Kelantan
Kelantan royal consorts
Converts to Islam
Malaysian Muslims
Czech Muslims
1988 births